Pytia (Greek: Πυτιά, Ancient Greek: Πυετία Pyetia also) is curdled milk obtained from an animal's stomach, containing (and used as) rennet.

References
Arist.HA522b5, PA676a6, GA739b22, Nic.Al.68, 323.
Pytia A Greek-English Lexicon
Food in the Ancient World from A to Z
How you make  the Traditional Pytia by Santorini.gr

Greek cuisine
Dairy products